Bo Hi Pak (August 18, 1930 – January 12, 2019 in Korea. Korean: 박보희/朴普熙) was a prominent member of the Unification Church. During the 1970s and 1980s, he was a major leader in the church movement, leading projects such as newspapers (notably The Washington Times), schools, performing arts projects, political projects such as the anti-communist organization CAUSA International, and was president of the Unification Church International 1977–1991.  He was also the president of Little Angels Children's Folk Ballet of Korea.

Life 
Pak was a lieutenant colonel in the South Korean military when he joined the Unification Church in the 1950s. Serving church founder Sun Myung Moon as his main English interpreter during speaking tours in the United States, he was referred to in the media as Moon's "right-hand man" (or similarly), such as "Moon's top deputy".

He was the central figure in Moon's publishing businesses, including founding President and Publisher, The News World (later renamed New York City Tribune); founding President and Chairman of the Board, the Washington Times Corporation; and President, World Media Association.

In 1976 Pak incorporated True World Foods which became the largest sushi supplier in America.

In 1977/1978, Pak testified before the Fraser Committee in its investigation of the Unification Church, commenting: "I am a proud Korean – a proud Moonie – and a dedicated anti-Communist and I intend to remain so the rest of my life."  In response to the adversarial investigation, Pak wrote Truth is My Sword. Alexander Haig commented in the introduction: "From the battlefield of the Korean peninsula to the halls of the U.S. Congress, Dr. Pak's speeches mirror the convictions of an individual whose ardent sense of justice has always been the cornerstone of his advocacy of personal freedom and democracy."

In 1984 Pak was kidnapped in New York City and held for ransom.  The FBI arrested the kidnappers, who claimed that the crime was an attempt to change Unification Church policy.<ref>Crime: Kidnaping of a Moonie, Time, December 10, 1984</ref>

In 1987 at a church gathering, a Zimbabwean Unification Church member who was thought by Moon to be the continuous "channel" on earth for his deceased son Heung Jin Moon, "beat Bo Hi Pak so badly that he was hospitalized for a week in Georgetown Hospital." The Washington Post'' reported that "Later, Pak underwent surgery in South Korea to repair a blood vessel in his skull, according to Times executives."

In 1994, Pak visited North Korea to attend the funeral of President Kim Il Sung, risking legal trouble by the South Korean government in doing so. In 1998 he visited again, leading a trade delegation representing Unification Church interests with the blessing of the South Korean government.

On July 20, 2004 the Eastern Seoul District Prosecutor imprisoned Pak and charged him with financial fraud because he was unable to repay his debts to Korean businessmen.  In 2006, Pak was released on probation after serving 2 years and 3 ½ months. On November 6, 2006, he sent a letter to be distributed by Unification Church publications worldwide to give an account of his experiences in prison. In the letter he wrote:

See also 
 Unification Church political activities
 Koreagate
 Subcommittee on International Organizations of the Committee on International Relations (Fraser Committee)
 True World Foods

References

External links

 Book by James Gavin
 Messiah, a book about Sun Myung Moon by Bo Hi Pak
 Open letter to members of the Unification Church by InJin Moon
 Letter to Unification Church publications by Bo Hi Pak

1930 births
2019 deaths
South Korean anti-communists
South Korean Unificationists
South Korean military personnel
South Korean prisoners and detainees
Prisoners and detainees of South Korea
The Washington Times people
Kidnapped South Korean people
People convicted of fraud